Center Parkway/Washington (also known as Center Parkway Station) is a light rail station on the Metro line in Tempe, Arizona, United States.

Ridership

Notable places nearby
 Salt River Project complex

References

External links
 Valley Metro map

Valley Metro Rail stations
Railway stations in the United States opened in 2008
2008 establishments in Arizona
Buildings and structures in Tempe, Arizona